The districts of Sri Lanka are further divided into administrative sub-units known as divisional secretariats. They were originally based on the feudal counties, the korales and ratas. Divisional secretariats are the third level administrative divisions of the country and there are currently 331 divisional secretariats in Sri Lanka.

They were formerly known as 'D.R.O. Divisions' after the 'Divisional Revenue Officer'. Later the D.R.O.s became 'Assistant Government Agents' and the Divisions were known as 'A.G.A. Divisions'. Currently, the Divisions are administered by a 'Divisional Secretary', and are known as 'D.S. Divisions'.

The 331 divisions are listed below, by district:

Divisional secretariats

See also 
 Provinces of Sri Lanka
 Districts of Sri Lanka

References

External links 
 Divisional Secretariats Portal
 Statoids: Divisions of Sri Lanka

Sri Lanka geography-related lists
Lists of subdivisions of Sri Lanka